Into the Labyrinth is a 2019 Italian thriller film directed by Donato Carrisi. The film stars Toni Servillo, Valentina Bellè, Vinicio Marchioni, and Dustin Hoffman. The film was released in October 2019.

Cast
 Dustin Hoffman as Doctor Green
 Toni Servillo as Bruno Genko
 Valentina Bellè as Samantha Andretti
 Vinicio Marchioni as Simon Berish
 Katsiaryna Shulha as Linda
 Riccardo Cicogna as Paul MacInsky
 Luis Gnecco as Mordecai Lumann

Production
Principal photography for the film took place in Rome.

References

External links
 

2019 films
Italian thriller films
Films shot in Rome
Rainbow S.r.l. films